Lauren Barron (born October 17, 1997, in Mount Pearl) is a Canadian curler from St. John's, Newfoundland and Labrador.

Career
During her junior career, Barron played second for Rebecca Roberts with Chantal Newell at third and Sydney Parsons at lead. The team represented the Memorial University of Newfoundland at the 2018 U Sports/Curling Canada University Curling Championships where they finished with a 1–6 record. Also in juniors, Barron represented Newfoundland and Labrador at the 2015 Canada Winter Games with skip Megan Kearley, finishing in twelfth with a 2–5 record. Out of juniors, Barron joined Team Sarah Hill.

Due to the COVID-19 pandemic in Newfoundland and Labrador, many teams had to opt out of the 2021 Newfoundland and Labrador Scotties Tournament of Hearts as they could not commit to the quarantine process in order to compete in the 2021 Scotties Tournament of Hearts. This meant that only Team Hill and their clubmates Mackenzie Mitchell's rink entered the event. In the best-of-five series, Team Hill defeated Team Mitchell three games to one to earn the right to represent Newfoundland and Labrador at the 2021 Scotties in Calgary, Alberta. At the Tournament of Hearts, they finished with a 2–6 round robin record, with wins against New Brunswick's Melissa Adams and Nunavut's Lori Eddy.

Personal life
Barron is currently an earth science student at the Memorial University of Newfoundland. She is in a relationship with Kevin Girouard.

Teams

References

External links

1997 births
Canadian women curlers
Living people
Curlers from Newfoundland and Labrador
People from Mount Pearl
Sportspeople from St. John's, Newfoundland and Labrador
Memorial University of Newfoundland alumni